Niobia may refer to:
 Niobia Bryant, American novelist of romance and mainstream fiction
 Niobia (cnidarian), a genus of cnidarians in the family Niobiidae
 Three forms of niobium oxide:
 Niobium monoxide (niobium(II) oxide), NbO
 Niobium dioxide (niobium(IV) oxide), NbO2
 Niobium pentoxide (niobium(V) oxide), Nb2O5